Pedro Ken Morimoto Moreira (born 20 March 1987), known as Pedro Ken, is a Brazilian footballer. He is of Japanese descent.

Career

Club
Pedro Ken was born in Curitiba, Paraná. In 2007, when Coritiba won the Série B, Pedro Ken, Keirrison and Henrique were called Trio de Ouro (in English: Golden Trio) because of their important role in the championship, young age and good prospects.

On 7 December 2009 Pedro Ken left Coritiba to sign for league rival Cruzeiro. He signed a five-year contract with the club.

On 1 June 2011 Pedro Ken joined Avaí on a season-long loan deal.

On 22 December 2012, on an exchange for Nílton, Cruzeiro loaned Ken for Club de Regatas Vasco da Gama until the end of 2013 season.

In January 2016, Ken went on trial with FC Terek Grozny, going on to sign a 2.5-year contract with Terek on 3 February 2016. 
He left the club in March 2017.

International
Pedro played once for the Olympic National Team in a commemorative match against Brasileirão's best players. He did not score in that game.

Honours
Coritiba
Campeonato Brasileiro Série B: 2007
Campeonato Paranaense: 2008

Cruzeiro
Campeonato Mineiro: 2011

Ceará
Campeonato Cearense: 2018

References

External links

1987 births
Living people
Footballers from Curitiba
Brazilian people of Japanese descent
Brazilian footballers
Association football midfielders
Campeonato Brasileiro Série A players
Campeonato Brasileiro Série B players
Coritiba Foot Ball Club players
Cruzeiro Esporte Clube players
Avaí FC players
Esporte Clube Vitória players
CR Vasco da Gama players
Ceará Sporting Club players
Operário Ferroviário Esporte Clube players
Russian Premier League players
FC Akhmat Grozny players
Brazilian expatriate footballers
Brazilian expatriate sportspeople in Russia
Expatriate footballers in Russia